This is a list of number one singles on the Billboard Japan Hot 100 chart in 2009.

See also
Lists of Hot 100 number-one singles of 2009

References 

2009 in Japanese music
Japan Hot 100
Lists of number-one songs in Japan